The El Salvador national rugby union team (Spanish: rugby union equipo nacional de El Salvador), nicknamed Los Torogoces, represents El Salvador in rugby union. They had their first international tournament in 2011 in Costa Rica along the other teams from Central America, winning the Silver Cup.

History
El Salvador started playing matches against Guatemalan clubs in 2009, losing 3−85 against Xela and winning 37–11 against Santa Rosa.
Consequently, a victory against Xela Rugby Club 17–0, after clinching the second place in the Guatemalan Championship the "Torogoces" prepare 2 teams to give battle in the upcoming championship, which is in this case to bring the 1st place.

El Salvador's coaches are from France and Argentina. Even though rugby is such a young sport in this country, it is opening way within other popular sports. Recently, the Salvadoran Rugby Association (Federacion Salvadorena de Rugby) was recognized as a federation from the local Olympic committee, making it an official recognized sport in El Salvador.

El Salvador played their first international against Costa Rica as part of the 2012 South American Rugby Championship "C".  They recorded their first international win, during the 2014 ARC, over Costa Rica.  They went on to defeat Panama, which secured their first major tournament victory.

Record

Overall

Tournaments

Leadership
Coaches
Ivan Seassal (Fra)
Frédéric Buscail  (Fra)

Board of Directors
 Chairman: Daniel Ola
 Vice chair: Nelson Bolaños
 Treasurer: Diana Diaz
 Secretary: Moisés Nóchez

Players

Current players
El Salvador's rugby union team has a mixture of local young athletes with the reinforcement of experienced foreign players.
Torogoces now remains as El Salvador's national team, recognized by CONSUR as a member and will participate in south and Central American tournaments under that name. Rugby in this country has evolved and two clubs have been created: Cuscatlan Rugby Club and Santa Tecla Rugby Club, both still participating in the binational club league with Guatemala. Players from both teams will be  selected by trainers and the Federacion Salvadorena de Rugby to be part of Torogoces for international tournaments.
In September 2013, Cuscatlán Rugby Club became the first Salvadoran team to win the Bi-National League with Guatemala.

Women national team 

COACH: Chad Hayward

Current players

See also
 Salvadoran Rugby Association
 Rugby union in El Salvador

References

External links
https://web.archive.org/web/20120218230153/http://torogoces.com/

Rugby union in El Salvador
Central American national rugby union teams
National sports teams of El Salvador